An Austrian passport is an identity document issued to citizens of Austria to facilitate international travel. Every Austrian citizen is also a citizen of the European Union. The passport, along with the national identity card, allows for free rights of movement and residence in any of the states of the European Economic Area and Switzerland.

The application and printing processes of all Austrian passports are handled by the Österreichische Staatsdruckerei (de) headquartered in Vienna.

Physical appearance

Austrian passports are the same burgundy colour as other European passports, with the Austrian coat of arms emblazoned in the centre of the front cover. The words "EUROPÄISCHE UNION" (English: European Union) and "REPUBLIK ÖSTERREICH" are inscribed above the coat of arms and the word "REISEPASS" is inscribed below it. Austrian passports have the standard biometric symbol at the bottom and use the standard EU design. Each page of the passport shows the coat of arms of a different Austrian state in the background. A new passport design is scheduled for 2023.

Different spellings of the same name within the same document

German names containing umlauts (ä, ö, ü) and/or ß are spelled in the correct way in the non-machine-readable zone of the passport, but with simple vowel + E and/or SS in the machine-readable zone, e.g. Müller becomes MUELLER, Groß becomes GROSS, and Gößmann becomes GOESSMANN.

The transcription mentioned above is generally used for airplane tickets etc., but sometimes (like in US visas) also simple vowels are used (MULLER, GOSSMANN). The three possible spelling variants of the same name (e.g. Müller / Mueller / Muller) in different documents sometimes lead to confusion, and the use of two different spellings within the same document (like in the passport) may give people who are unfamiliar with the German orthography the impression that the document is a forgery.

Austrian passports may (but do not always) contain a trilingual (in German, English, and French) explanation of the German umlauts and ß, e.g. 'ß' entspricht / is equal to / correspond à 'SS'.

Visa requirements

Visa requirements for Austrian citizens are administrative entry restrictions imposed by the authorities of foreign states on citizens of Austria.  Austrian citizens had visa-free or visa on arrival access (including eTAs) to 188 countries and territories, ranking the Austrian passport 5th in the world in terms of travel freedom (tied with Danish, Dutch, and Swedish passports) according to the Henley Passport Index.

Austrian citizens can live and work in any country within the EU as a result of the right of free movement and residence granted in Article 21 of the EU Treaty.

Holding a second passport

Austria allows its citizens to hold a second Austrian passport to circumvent certain travel restrictions (e.g., some Arab countries, such as Iraq (except Iraqi Kurdistan), Oman, and Mauritania, do not allow entry to Austrian passport holders with Israeli passport stamps).

Holding an Austrian passport and a foreign passport at the same time—i.e., dual citizenship—is restricted under the current Austrian nationality law. In general, only those who acquired multiple citizenships at birth can have dual/multiple citizenship. Austrians who voluntary acquire citizenship of another country automatically lose their Austrian citizenship, unless they have obtained permission to retain their Austrian citizenship beforehand.

History
Before Austria became a member of the European Union in 1995, passports had an outer light brown/inner dark brown cover ("Serie A–E") until sometime during the 1970s, when it switched to a dark green cover.

Image gallery

See also
 Visa requirements for Austrian citizens
 Passports of the European Union

References

Austria
Government of Austria
European Union passports